WMFM (107.9 FM) is a radio station broadcasting a Spanish Tropical format. Licensed to Key West, Florida, United States, the station serves the Florida Keys area. The station simulcasts WXDJ In Miami.  The station is currently owned by South Broadcasting System, Inc., It is operated by Spanish Broadcasting System under a Local marketing agreement.

History
The station went on the air as WWFT on 1991-01-18.  on 1993-09-03, the station changed its call sign to WSKP, on 1997-11-21 to WVMQ, on 2000-04-05 to WRLA, on 2001-07-01 to the current WMFM,

References

External links

MFM
Radio stations established in 1991
Spanish Broadcasting System radio stations
1991 establishments in Florida